Galatina Air Base  is an airbase near Galatina, south of the city of Lecce in the Apulia (Puglia) region of Italy. Currently the Italian Air Force's 10th Aircraft Maintenance Unit is based there, which maintains the air force's MB-339 training and light attack jets.

See also

List of airports in Italy

References

External links
 
 

Airports in Apulia
Buildings and structures in the Province of Lecce